Lukáš Poživil (born September 12, 1982) is a Czech former professional ice hockey defenceman. 

Poživil played in the Czech Extraliga for HC Litvínov, HC České Budějovice, HC Kladno and HC Plzeň. He also played one game for HC Fribourg-Gottéron during the 2005–06 Nationalliga A season.

His younger brother Ondřej Poživil is also a professional ice hockey player.

References

External links

1982 births
Living people
Motor České Budějovice players
Czech ice hockey defencemen
ETC Crimmitschau players
HC Fribourg-Gottéron players
Rytíři Kladno players
Lausitzer Füchse players
HC Litvínov players
HC Most players
Sportspeople from Most (city)
Piráti Chomutov players
HC Plzeň players
ERC Selb players
HC Slovan Ústečtí Lvi players
Czech expatriate ice hockey players in Switzerland
Czech expatriate ice hockey players in Germany